The 1966 Toledo Rockets football team was an American football team that represented Toledo University in the Mid-American Conference (MAC) during the 1966 NCAA University Division football season. In their fourth season under head coach Frank Lauterbur, the Rockets compiled a 2–7–1 record (1–5 against MAC opponents), tied for sixth place in the MAC, and outscored all opponents by a combined total of 162 to 137.

The team's statistical leaders included John Schneider with 1,537 passing yards, Roland Moss with 443 rushing yards and 38 points scored, and Henry Burch with 480 receiving yards.

Schedule

References

Toledo
Toledo Rockets football seasons
Toledo Rockets football